Tiny Toon Adventures: Defenders of the Universe is a cancelled fighting game. Based on the Tiny Toon Adventures franchise, it was initially scheduled for release in mid-2002, but was cancelled for unknown reasons, despite having completed development. It was developed by Treasure and it was originally slated for the PlayStation 2. Nintendo Power has listed this game in its publication, suggesting that there was also going to be a GameCube version. On 25 February 2009, a ROM image of the game was released by a member of the internet forum, Lost Levels.

The surviving voice actors from the TV series reprised their roles as their characters for this game, with Charlie Adler returning as the voice of Buster and Zag and Billy West replacing the late Don Messick as the voice of Hamton.

Gameplay and premise

The plot of Defenders of the Universe centers on Montana Max taking over the planet Gold Star. Natives of the planet, the Bullions, escape and ask Buster Bunny, Babs Bunny, Plucky Duck, and Hamton Pig for help.

Development and cancellation
Originally titled Tiny Toon Adventures: Defenders of the Looniverse, Defenders of the Universe was first announced in 2001 with a planned spring 2002 release. It was later expected for release by the summer that same year.

In 2004, Douglas C. Perry for IGN suggested that the game had always been intended for release, mentioning that it was "still officially slated to come out sometime (not necessarily in 2004)". However, years later, nothing new has been mentioned about the game. Considering the fact that support for the PlayStation 2 and GameCube has been discontinued, the game's resurrection and release are unlikely. Before its cancellation, the game was given an ESRB rating and was shown on retail listings.

Reception
Kurt Kalata from Hardcore Gaming 101 theorized that the game was planned to be the spiritual successor to Treasure's 1999 Japanese-exclusive Rakugaki Showtime, noting its similarities in gameplay and mechanics. The director and one of the designers of the game, Tetsuhiko Kikuchi, was also the director and one of the designers of Rakugaki Showtime, and Tsunehisa Kanagae was another designer who worked on both games, as did programmer Masaki Ukyo.

References

External links
Official developer's website
The World of Tiny Toon Adventures Game Information Page

Cancelled GameCube games
Cancelled PlayStation 2 games
Video games based on Tiny Toon Adventures
Video games developed in Japan
Video games about extraterrestrial life
Video games set in Egypt
Video games set on fictional planets
Treasure (company) games
Fighting games
Multiplayer and single-player video games
Conspiracy Entertainment games
Vaporware video games